Ansari or Al Ansari is a typically Muslim surname mainly found in the Middle East and South Asia. People with the surname Al-Ansari or Ansari are said to be the descendants of the Ansar tribesmen of Medina. Notable Ansaris include:

A–K
Abbas Ansari (born 1992), Indian sportsman and shooter
Abdolreza Ansari (1925–2020), Iranian politician 
Abdulaziz Rashid Al Ansari (born 1992), Qatari footballer
Abdul Haq Ansari (1931–2012), Indian Islamic philosopher
Abdul Qaiyum Ansari (1905–1973), Indian active in the freedom struggle of India
Abdur Razzaque Ansari, Indian Muslim nationalist, freedom fighter, and a weavers revolution leader
Afzal Ansari (born 1953), Indian politician
Akbar Ansari (born 1988), English cricketer of Pakistani descent 
Akram Ansari (born 1954), Pakistani politician
Ali Ansari (born 1967), Iranian-British history professor
Ali Al Ansari, Emirati paralympic athlete 
Allama Mustafa Hussain Ansari, (1945–2006), Kashmiri writer and public speaker
Amir Ansari (born 1970), American businessman and entrepreneur of Iranian descent  
Anousheh Ansari (born 1966), Iranian-American engineer, businesswoman and entrepreneur
Asad Ansari, Pakistani-Canadian accused of terrorism
Aziz Ansari (born 1983), American actor, comedian, writer, producer, and director
Bushra Ansari, Pakistani television presenter, comedian, singer, actress and playwright
Doris Ansari, British politician and former chair of Cornwall County Council
Faheem Ansari, Indian national who was charged with involvement in the 2008 Mumbai attacks
Fahad Al Ansari (born 1987), Kuwaiti footballer
Faris Muslim al Ansari (born 1984), Afghan held in Guantanamo
Iftikhar Hussain Ansari (born 1936-2014) Shia Cleric And Politician 
Imran Raza Ansari (born 1972), Shia Cleric and Politician
Furkan Ansari (born 1948), Indian politician
Gholamreza Ansari (born 1956), Iranian politician
Jaber Ansari (born 1987), Iranian footballer
Jamshed Ansari (1942–2005), Pakistani film, television and radio actor
Karim Ansarifard (born 1990), Iranian footballer
Khalid A. H. Ansari, Indian entrepreneur, journalist
Khizar Humayun Ansari, British race relations academic

M–Z
Majid Ansari (born 1954), Iranian cleric and politician
Master Taj-ud-Din Ansari, Pakistani politician
Mateen Ansari (1916–1943), Indian soldier in British army
Maulana Mohammad Abbas Ansari (1936–2022), Shiite Muslim leader in Jammu and Kashmir
Mohammad Ansari (disambiguation), a number of people
Mujib Rahman Ansari (1982–2022), Afghan mullah
Mukhtar Ansari, Indian gangster turned politician
Mukhtar Ahmed Ansari (1880–1936), Indian nationalist and political leader
Mustafa al-Ansari, Saudi accused of terrorism
Nazenin Ansari, Iranian journalist in exile
Noushafarin Ansari (born 1939), Indian-born Iranian librarian, educator and manager
Rais Ansari, Urdu Indian poet
Sahar Ansari (born 1939), Pakistani Urdu poet, critic and scholar 
Salim Miya Ansari, Nepalese politician
Saman Ansari (born 1974), Pakistani television actress
Sarah Ansari, British professor of history
Sheikh Sadiq Ali Ansari (active 1901), Indian politician
Siamak Ansari (born 1968), Iranian television actor and director
Sibakatullah Ansari, Indian politician
SM Razaullah Ansari (born 1932), Indian physicist
Zabiuddin Ansari a.k.a. Abu Hamza or Abu Jundal, an Indian national, accused of being involved in 2008 Mumbai attacks
Zeeshan Ansari (born 1999), Indian cricketer
Zafar Ansari (born 1991), English cricketer of Pakistani descent
Zafar Ishaq Ansari (1932–2016), Pakistani scholar of Islamic Studies

References

External links